Glory Vase (foaled 2 March 2015), is a Japanese Thoroughbred racehorse. He showed promising form in his first two seasons of racing, winning two minor races and finishing fifth in the Kikuka Sho. As a four-year-old in 2019 he emerged as a world-class performer, winning the Nikkei Shinshun Hai and running second in the spring edition of the Tenno Sho before recording his biggest victory in the Hong Kong Vase. He won the Kyoto Daishoten in 2020.

Background
Glory Vase is a dark bay horse with a white blaze and a white sock on his right hind leg bred in Japan by Lake Villa Farm. In 2016 the yearling was entered in the Select Sale and was bought for ¥56,160,000 by the Silk Horse Club. The horse entered the ownership of Silk Racing and was sent into training with Tomohito Ozeki.

He was from the eighth crop of foals sired by Deep Impact, who was the Japanese Horse of the Year in 2005 and 2006, winning races including the Tokyo Yushun, Tenno Sho, Arima Kinen and Japan Cup. Deep Impact's other progeny include Gentildonna, Harp Star, Kizuna, A Shin Hikari, Marialite and Saxon Warrior.

Glory Vase was the first foal of his dam Mejiro Tsubone who showed some racing ability, winning four races from 26 starts between 2010 and 2014. She was a granddaughter of the Yushun Himba winner Mejiro Ramonu, who, as a descendant of the broodmare Betsy Ross (foaled 1939), was related to Makybe Diva and Canford Cliffs.

Racing career

2017: two-year-old season
On 1 October 2017 at Nakayama Racecourse Glory Vase made a successful track debut when he defeated thirteen opponents in an event for previously unraced juveniles over 1800 metres. On his only other appearance that year he was narrowly beaten by Kafuji Vanguard in the Koyamaki Sho over 1600 metres at Chukyo Racecourse.

2018: three-year-old season
Glory Vase began his second season by starting the 2.4/1 second favourite for the Grade 3 Kisaragi Sho over 1800 metres at Kyoto Racecourse on 4 February. He moved up to join the front-running Satono Favor approaching the final turn but although he kept on well in the straight he was unable to get past the leader and was beaten a nose into second place. After a three-month break the colt returned to the same track in May for the Grade 2 Kyoto Shimbun Hai over 2200 metres and finished fourth of the seventeen runners, two and a half lengths behind the winner Stay Foolish. Another lengthy break followed before the colt contested the Sado Stakes over 2000 metres at Niigata Racecourse on 28 July. Ridden by Mirco Demuro he started odds-on favourite and won by one and a quarter lengths from Bear In Mind. On his final appearance of the year, the colt was stepped up in class and distance for the Grade 1 Kikuka Sho over 3000 metres at Kyoto on 21 October and started a 74/1 outsider in an eighteen-runner field. Ridden by Yuichi Fukunaga he raced towards the rear before producing an "impressive late drive" on the outside to come home fifth behind Fierement, Etario, You Can Smile and Blast Onepiece.

2019: four-year-old season

On his first appearance of 2019 Glory Vase, with Demuro in the saddle, started the 1.7/1 favourite for the Grade 2 Nikkei Shinshun Hai over 2400 metres at Kyoto on 13 January. After racing in mid-division he moved into contention approaching the final turn, took the lead inside the last 200 metres and kept on to win by half a length from the six-year-old Look Twice. For his next start the colt was stepped back up to the highest class for the spring edition of the Tenno Sho over 3200 metres at Kyoto on 28 April and went off the 10.3/1 sixth choice in a thirteen-runner field. He tracked the favourite Fierement for most of the way before moving up to challenge that horse for the lead in the straight. The two engaged in what was described as a "fierce duel" in the closing stages before Fierement defeated Glory Vase by a neck, the pair finishing six lengths clear of the rest.

Glory Vase was off the track for more than five months before returning in the Grade 2 Kyoto Daishoten on 6 October when he started favourite but finished sixth of the seventeen runners behind the 90/1 outsider Dreadnoughtus. For his final run of the season the colt was sent to Hong Kong to contest the Hong Kong Vase over 2400 metres at Sha Tin Racecourse on 8 December. Ridden by the locally based João Moreira he started the 7.2/1 third favourite behind the 2018 winner Exultant and the 2019 Epsom Derby winner Anthony Van Dyck while the other eleven runners included Lucky Lilac, Deirdre, Aspetar (Preis von Europa) and Prince of Arran (runner-up in the Melbourne Cup). Glory Vase was restrained in the early stages before beginning to make progress 600 metres from the finish. He overtook the front-running Exultant 200 metres out and accelerated away from his opponents to win in "impressive" style by three and a half lengths. After the race Tomohito Ozeki said "I’m overwhelmed. The plan was to come here, we’ve been targeting this race because we felt the track would suit him and the owner was happy to come. Winning international races like this, this is my job as a trainer, this is the best. Moreira did an amazing job riding the horse. We had a meeting together yesterday and felt good about our chances."

In the 2019 World's Best Racehorse Rankings Glory Vase was given a rating of 125, making him the 9th best racehorse in the world.

2020: five-year-old season
At Hanshin Racecourse on 28 June Glory Vase began his 2020 campaign by starting the 9.7/1 fifth choice in the betting for the 61st edition of the Grade 1 Takarazuka Kinen but ran poorly and came home seventeenth of the eighteen runners behind Chrono Genesis, beaten more than thirty lengths by the winner. As in the previous season Glory Vase returned from the summer break in Kyoto Daishoten on 11 October when he was ridden by Yuga Kawada and started the 5.2/1 third favourite behind Kiseki (2017 Kikuka Sho) and King of Koji (Meguro Kinen) in a seventeen-runner field. He settled in fifth place before moving up on the outside on the final turn, taking the lead in the last 200 metres and keeping on well to win by three quarters of a length from Kiseki.

On 29 November Glory Vase was again partnered by Kawada when he went off the 16.2/1 fourth choice in the betting for the Japan Cup over 2400 metres at Tokyo Racecourse. He race in second place for most of the way behind the runaway leader Kiseki but after making a strong challenge in the straight he was outpaced in the closing stages and came home fifth behind Almond Eye, Contrail, Daring Tact and Curren Bouquetd'or, beaten two lengths by the winner.

In the 2020 World's Best Racehorse Rankings, Glory Vase was rated on 123, making him the equal fifteenth best racehorse in the world.

Pedigree

References 

2015 racehorse births
Racehorses bred in Japan
Racehorses trained in Japan
Thoroughbred family 9-f